Doug Dagger (born Douglas Scott Kane, October 17, 1967, New York City, United States) is an American vocalist. He is the lead singer for the Los Angeles punk rock band The Generators, which formed in 1997, and was lead singer for Schleprock and other punk bands.

Life and early career
Kane was born into an entertainment family; his mother was a nightclub showgirl and his father was an entertainment manager. Kane is also the grandson of 1930s Vaudeville musician Buster Shaver. Kane Moved to South Pasadena, California in 1978, and by 1981 he was involved in the early Los Angeles punk scene. By 1983, at the age of 15, Kane was singing in his first punk band, Doug & The Slugz. By 1984, the band changed their name to The Risk.

Professional career
In the summer of 1988, Kane started sing for the Alhambra, California-based punk band Schleprock. By 1990, the band released their first EP, “Do It All” on Nemesis Records, alongside labelmates The Offspring. Over the next decade, Kane and Schleprock released six more EPs: Looking Back (1992), Gotta Get Out (1993), Spring (1993), Migraine (1994), Something Like That (1994) and Out Of Spite (1995).  They also released two full-length albums: Hide & Seek (1993) and Propeller (1994). They signed a deal with Warner Bros. Records in 1996, and released their last full-length album Americas Dirty Little Secret Over a stretch of eight years, the band support such bands as Green Day, NOFX, Blink 182, Primus, Bad Religion, The Specials and Face to Face. Schleprock disbanded in February 1997, and within six months, Kane formed his new band The Generators. In 1998, the band released its first full-length album, Welcome To The End, on Triple X Records. The Generators have since released 7 more full-length albums: Burning Ambition (2000), Tyranny (2001), Excess, Betrayal and Our Dearly Departed (2003), Winter Of Discontent (2005), Great Divide (2007), Between The Devil & The Deep Blue Sea (2009) and Last Of The Pariahs (2011) (along with many other splits and EPs).  The Generators have developed a rich popularity in Europe and recently signed with Randale Records for the release of their 9th studio album.  The Generators have also contributed music for the Los Angeles Lakers, California Angels, Corono and The Grammy Awards foundation.

Kane still resides in Los Angeles, and owns and operates a clothing/uniform business in between touring and making records. Doug started a new band called the Bedlam Knives.

Discography

Schleprock
 Do It All 7-inch (1989), Nemesis Records
 Looking Back 7-inch (1992) Empty Records
 Gotta Get Out 7-inch (1992) Kool Records
 Hide & Seek (1993) Last Resort Records
 Ten Speed 7-inch (1993) Last Resort Records
 Migraine 7-inch (1994) Break Even Point Records, Italy
 Something Like That 7-inch (1994) Dr, Strange Records
 Propeller (1994) Dr. Strange Records
 Out Of Spite (1995) Dr. Strange Records
 America's Dirty Little Secret (1996) Warner Bros. Records
 Long Time Ago - Anthology (1997) Cool Guy Records
 Learning To Fall - Anthology (2005) People Like You, Europe

The Generators
 Welcome to the End (1997), Triple X Records, US
 Ninety-Nine (1999), Outcast Records/ Triple X Records, Europe
 Burning Ambition (2000), Urgent Music Ltd. US / People Like You, Europe & Japan
 "Dead at 16 7-inch, TKO Records
 Tyranny (2001), TKO Records US / People Like You, Europe & Japan
 State of the Nation (2002), TKO Records/ Dead Beat, US
 "Sounds of the Street Vol. 2: Urgent Music Ltd. US, Split CD w/ Vicious Rumors"
 "From Rust to Ruin, TKO Records (compilation: greatest hits album)
 "Riverboat Gamblers split 7-inch Pirates Press Records
 Excess, Betrayal...And Our Dearly Departed (2003), People Like You, Europe & Japan, Fiend Music, US
 The Winter of Discontent (2006), People Like You, Europe & Japan, Sailor's Grave, US
 The Great Divide (2007), People Like You, Europe & Japan
 Between the Devil and the Deep Blue Sea (2009), Concrete Jungle/People Like You, Europe & Japan
 Last Of The Pariahs (2011), IHP Records, Europe & Japan, DC-Jam Records, US
 The Deconstruction of Dreams (Concrete Jungle Records 2013)
 Life Gives-Life Takes (Randale Records 2014)

Bedlam Knives
 Bedlam Knives - Self Titled Demo (2010)
 Here Comes Trouble - EP (Dr. Strange Records 2013)

References

External links
Doug Dagger @ Discogs.com
Punk Rock '77 thru Today: The Generators ***New Interview***
The Generators
DOUG DAGGER
punkrocknews.de - Interviews - The Generators - English version

1967 births
Living people
American punk rock singers
Singers from Los Angeles
Singers from New York City